The German Taekwondo Union ( or DTU) is the largest taekwondo association in Germany. It is a member of the German Olympic Sports Confederation (Deutscher Olympischer Sportbund or DOSB).

International competition

DTU is a member of the European umbrella organization European Taekwondo Union (ETU) as well as the World Association for World Taekwondo (WT).

On the part of the German Olympic Committee, the German Taekwondo Union is the only taekwondo association authorized to send athletes to the Olympic Games.

References

External links
  

Sports organizations established in 1981
Taekwondo organizations
Taekwondo
National members of World Taekwondo
Taekwondo in Germany
1981 establishments in Germany
National Taekwondo teams